Igors Vladimirovich Stepanovs (born 1 February 1966 in Latvian SSR) is a former Latvian football midfielder. Having played at club and international level with Igors Stepanovs, he was often referred as Igors V. Stepanovs.

Honours

Club
Skonto
 Latvian Champion (2):
1992, 1995

External links

1966 births
Living people
Latvian footballers
Latvia international footballers
Skonto FC players
Association football midfielders